Kynaston is both a surname and a given name. Notable people with the name include:

Surname:
 Sir Roger Kynaston, 15th-century English knight
 David Kynaston, English historian and author
 Edward Kynaston, English actor
 Francis Kynaston, English courtier and poet
Francis Kynaston (died 1590), MP
 Humphrey Kynaston, English highwayman who operated in the Shropshire area

Given name:
 Kynaston Reeves, also known as Philip Arthur Reeves, English actor
 Kynaston Studd, known as "JEK", British cricketer and businessman

See also
 Kynaston, Herefordshire, hamlet in England
 Kynaston, Shropshire, England